Drosophila prolongata is a fly of the family Drosophilidae. This species is endemic to southeast Asia. Males of this species express one of most extreme reversed sexual size dimorphism (i.e. males are larger than females) in the Drosophilidae, making this species an interesting model organism for the study of sexual selection. Males also display remarkable copulation courtship behaviour.

References 

prolongata
Insects of Southeast Asia